Postal codes in Myanmar are five digit numbers. The first two digits of the postal code denote the  States, Regions, and Union Territories.

Listed below are the first 2 digits of the codes assigned to each state and region.

States, Regions, and Union Territories

External links
Myanmar Post Office

Myanmar
Postal codes